The 1978 ABN World Tennis Tournament was a men's tennis tournament played on indoor carpet courts at Rotterdam Ahoy in the Netherlands. It was a World Championship Tennis (WCT) event that was part of the 1978 Colgate-Palmolive Grand Prix circuit. It was the sixth edition of the tournament and was held from 3 April through 9 April 1978. First-seeded Jimmy Connors won the singles title.

Finals

Singles

 Jimmy Connors defeated  Raúl Ramírez 7–5, 7–5

Doubles
 Fred McNair /  Raúl Ramírez defeated  Robert Lutz /  Stan Smith 6–2, 6–3

References

External links
 Official website 
 Official website 
 ATP tournament profile
 ITF tournament edition details

 
ABN World Tennis Tournament
1978 in Dutch tennis